Miss Ecuador 2016, the 66th Miss Ecuador pageant, was held on March 12, 2016 in Machala, El Oro. Francesca Cipriani, Miss Ecuador 2015 from Guayas crowned her successor Connie Jiménez of Los Ríos at the end of the event. The winner represented Ecuador at Miss Universe 2016.

Results

Placements

Special Awards

Best National Costume

Dream Sedal

Contestants

Notes

Debuts

Returns

Last compete in:

1999 
 Pastaza
2013
 Los Ríos
2014
 Manabí
 Santa Elena

Withdrawals

 Carchi
 Cotopaxi
 Imbabura
 Santo Domingo
 Tungurahua

Crossovers
Cristina Vázquez competed at Reina de Cuenca 2011, but she was unplaced.
Ivanna Abad was 1st Runner-up (Virreina) at Reina de Machala 2009, and she was Top 5 at Miss Panamarican International 2012.
Karla Morales competed at Reina de Machala 2013 and Reina del Banano Ecuador 2014; she was unplaced in both pageants.
Karen Guerrero competed at Reina de Guayaquil 2014 where she was unplaced. She was elected Miss Congeniality.
Karen Vélez intended to compete at Miss Ecuador 2012, but she was eliminated as precandidate at the Miss Ecuador reality stage. She was Señorita Fundación de Loja 2009
Yoselin Noroña was Reina de Buena Fé 2014, Reina de Los Ríos 2014 and 1st Runner-up at Miss Tourism World 2015 in Malaysia.
Carmen Iglesias was Reina del Portoviejo 2014 and Reina de Manabí 2014.
Cecilia Drouet was Reina de Salinas 2012.
Zulibeth Coronel was Reina del Puyo 2010 and Reina de Pastaza 2010.
Milkha Moreira competed at Reina de Quito 2015, but she was unplaced.
Jushtin Osorio is from Guayaquil, but she represented the US Community.

References

External links
Official Miss Ecuador website

2016 beauty pageants
Beauty pageants in Ecuador
Miss Ecuador